Up The Empire is an American rock music band from Brooklyn, New York.  They were formerly known as Kilowatthours and were originally formed in 1998 in Louisville, Kentucky by Ben Lord and Chris Renn. The lineup was filled out with the addition of Dan Benningfield and Ryan Compton shortly thereafter.  Compton left the band in 2001, Benningfield in 2002.  Dan Hewins joined the band in 2002; Doug Keith and Brad Bennett joined in 2003. Kilowatthours released several albums and singles on the Temporary Residence Ltd. label before changing their name to Up The Empire in 2004.

Members 
 Ben Lord – drums
 Dan Hewins – bass guitar, synthesizer and vocals
 Doug Keith – guitars, keyboard, and vocals
 Chris Renn – guitars and vocals (not on loose ends)

Discography 
 Seaside EP (2005) Cougar Label
 Light Rides The Super Major (2007) Cougar Label
 Loose Ends (2008) Cougar Label

Kilowatthours discography
 Albums:
 The Bright Side
 Strain of Positive Thinking
 Kilowatthours / The Rum Diary Split CD
EPs:
 Insound Tour Support No.23
 Travels In Constants
 All Things Regarding
 7":
 Lessons In Time Management

References

External links
Up The Empire official website
Up The Empire on MySpace
 Nick R. Scalia : NYC indie-rockers return to make a racket at BAR January 25, 2006 - Play Magazine

Rock music groups from New York (state)
Musical groups established in 1998
Musical groups established in 2004
Musical groups from Louisville, Kentucky
Musical groups from Brooklyn
Rock music groups from Kentucky
1998 establishments in Kentucky
Temporary Residence Limited artists